The 1974 WFL Draft was the first collegiate draft of the World Football League (WFL). The first 6 rounds took place on January 4, at the JW Marriott Essex House in New York. The final thirty rounds were postponed until February 5.

On March 18, 1974, in addition to this selection process, the WFL held a Pro Draft of players from the NFL and CFL. It consisted of 480 selections in 40 rounds.

This would also be the last collegiate draft of the league. In 1975, because of the uncertainties facing the WFL, only a Pro Draft of entire NFL and CFL teams was held at its league meetings in Birmingham, Alabama.

Player selections

References

External links
 1974 WFL Draft
 1974 WFL Draft Pick Transactions 

World Football League
World Football League